The 2011 Wofford Terriers team represented Wofford College in the 2011 NCAA Division I FCS football season. The Terriers were led by 24th-year head coach Mike Ayers and played their home games at Gibbs Stadium. They are a member of the Southern Conference. They finished the season 8–4, 6–2 in SoCon play to finish in a tie for second place. They received an at-large bid into the FCS playoffs where they lost in the second round to Northern Iowa.

Schedule

References

Wofford
Wofford Terriers football seasons
Wofford
Wofford Terriers football